Fisherman's Castle, sometimes known as Irish Bayou Castle is a 942 square foot castle built on Irish Bayou between New Orleans and Slidell, Louisiana. Simon Villemarette built the castle in the style of a 14th-century chateau  in 1981 in anticipation of the 1984 World's Fair, and it was strong enough to survive both hurricanes Katrina, Isaac and Ida, although it required repairs following Katrina. Charles and Jean Kuhl bought the castle in 1995 and sold it in 2014.

References

Castles in the United States
World's fair architecture in the United States